Burn the Bridges is a 2007 Mexican film directed by Francisco Franco Alba, from an original script co-written by Franco and actress Maria Reneé Prudencio. The film was shot in the Mexican state of Zacatecas and addresses issues such as self-assertion, loss, adolescence, and sexual relations. It officially premiered in October 2007 at the Festival Internacional de Cine de Morelia. The title refers to a widely known Mexican saying, which means "to cut all ties holding someone to something or someone"—something Hernán Cortés is believed to have done when he and his men set foot for the first time in continental America, in order to avoid mutiny or desertion during the Spanish conquest of the Aztec Empire.

Plot
Elena (Irene Azuela) and Sebastián (Ángel Onésimo Nevárez) are a teenaged brother and sister who have been reunited at their home while looking after their ailing mother, singer Eugenia Díaz (Claudette Maille). Eugenia has been diagnosed with cancer and doesn't have long to live, and it has fallen to Elena and Sebastián to care for her in her last months, with Elena (who is older) spending her days with her mother while Sebastian goes to school and looks in on Eugenia in the evenings. Elena is obsessively caring for Sebastián, but while he loves his sister and mother, he seems detached from the affairs of his family. He's more drawn to his roughneck schoolmate Juan (Bernardo Benítez). As the reality of Eugenia's fate becomes clearer, Elena and Sebastián's confusion about love, mortality and family becomes more acute, and circumstances become even more muddled when they take in a boarder, Aurora (Jessica Segura), who falls in Sebastián's wealthy schoolmate Ismael (Ramón Valdez Urtiz).

Cast
Irene Azuela as Elena
Ángel Onésimo Nevárez as Sebastián
Claudette Maillé as Eugenia
Bernardo Benítez as Juan
Ramón Valdez Urtiz as Ismael
Juan Carlos Barreto as Efraín
Jessica Segura as Aurora
Aida López as Chayo
Alberto Estrella as Emilio 	
Diana Bracho as Catalina

Awards
The film won two Ariel Awards in 2008: for Best Actress (Irene Azuela) and for Best Original Music (Alejandro Giacomán, songs by Joselo Rangel). The film was also nominated for Best Art Design.

References

External links
 Official site
‘Quemar las naves’, una historia de soledad, El Universal
"Quemar las naves", romper con las ataduras, Anodis

2007 films
2000s Spanish-language films
Films set in Mexico
Mexican LGBT-related films
2007 LGBT-related films
LGBT-related drama films
Mexican drama films
2000s Mexican films